Plateau United Football Club of Jos (usually known as Plateau United) is a Nigerian professional football (soccer) club based in Jos, that competes in the  Nigerian Professional Football League. Before 1991, they were known as the JIB Strikers FC. The name "Plateau United" was the former name of their cross-town rivals Mighty Jets.

History
Plateau United were founded in 1975 as JIB Strikers FC.

Plateau United won their first major silverware in 1999, a 1-0 Nigeria Cup final victory over Iwuanyanwu Nationale on a goal by Donatus Iloka. They had lost in the final in 1993 and 1998. They made their continental debut in 2000, but were eliminated after their first tie.

They were promoted to the Nigeria Premier League for the 2010–11 season by winning on the last day against Mighty Jets, but were relegated back the next year on the last day. They were promoted back to the top league on the last day of the 2015 season.

In 2013, their feeder team were one of four clubs suspended, pending an investigation into their 79–0 victory over Akurba FC. The four clubs were accused of match-fixing in order to advance into the professional league. On 22 July 2013, Plateau Feeders, Akurba FC, Police Machine FC and Bubayaro FC were each banned for 10 years, with the players and officials in each game banned for life.

Plateau United won the Nigerian Professional Football League for the first time in 2017, led by coach Kennedy Boboye.

Achievements
Nigerian Professional Football League: 1 
 2017 
 2020 Top of the table when league was stopped due to COVID19

Nigerian FA Cup: 1
 1999
 Runners-up: 1993, 1998
 Unity Preseason Tournament: 1
 2021

Performance in CAF competitions
CAF Cup Winners' Cup: 1 appearance
2000  – First Round

CAF Champions League: 2018,
2020/21, 2022/23

Current team
As of 12 February 2023

Notable players
 
Chris Obodo
Celestine Babayaro
Mikel John Obi
Victor Obinna
Shehu Abdullahi
Sunday Ingbede
Daniel Itodo
Ibrahim Mustapha

References

External links
 Plateau United wins promotion
 Plateau Utd sack nine players

Jos
Football clubs in Nigeria
Association football clubs established in 1975
1975 establishments in Nigeria
Sports clubs in Nigeria